State Highway 170 (SH 170) is a state highway in Colorado that connects Eldorado Springs and Superior. SH 170's western terminus is at Eldorado Canyon State Park, and the eastern terminus is at U.S. Route 36 (US 36) in Superior.

Route description
The road begins at the edge of Eldorado Canyon State Park at El Dorado Springs as a dirt road. Speed limit in this area is at 10 mph. As the route leaves Downtown Eldorado Springs, it becomes a paved road and the speed limit increases to 25 mph. . SH 170 then heads eastward, meeting County Road 67 before passing through a rural grassy area. The route then meets SH 93, where it becomes Marshall Drive, just north of Marshall Lake. The road then finds its eastern terminus at US 36, the Denver-Boulder Turnpike, passing through the city of Superior.

Major intersections

References

External links

170
Colorado State Highway 170
Transportation in Boulder County, Colorado